Chaetostoma paucispinis is a species of catfish in the family Loricariidae. It is native to South America, where it occurs in the San Juan River basin in Colombia. The species reaches 9 cm (3.5 inches) in total length.

References 

Freshwater fish of Colombia
Fish described in 1912
paucispinis
Taxa named by Charles Tate Regan